Macaguán (Hitnü) is a Guahiban language that was spoken by about 400 people in Colombia. Many of its speakers are monoglots.

References

Languages of Colombia
Guajiboan languages